Ranachandi (Kannada: ರಣಚಂಡಿ) is a 1991 Indian Kannada film,  directed by  G. K. Mudduraj and produced by S. V. Ganesh & Friends. The film stars Radha, Sarath Babu, Charanjith and Raghavi in the lead roles. The film has musical score by Sax Raja.

Cast

Radha
Sarath Babu
Charanjith
Raghavi
Mukhyamantri Chandru
Avinash
Mysore Lokesh
Sudheer
Doddanna
Umashree
Sundar Krishna Urs
Lohithaswa
Master Anand
Ramesh Bhat
Krishne Gowda
B. K. Shankar
Srishailan

Music
"Naanu Yaaro" - S. P. Balasubrahmanyam, K. S. Chithra
"Huccharu Naavu Huccharu" - S. P. Balasubrahmanyam, K. S. Chithra
"Geetha I Love You" - S. P. Balasubrahmanyam, K. S. Chithra
"Hididare Saarayi" - Manjula Gururaj
"Chinna Chinna" - Manjula Gururaj
"Naanu Yaaro" - K. S. Chithra

References

External links
 

1991 films
1990s Kannada-language films
Films scored by Sax Raja